Davlatali Said is a politician from Tajikistan who is serving as First Deputy Prime Minister in Cabinet of Tajikistan.

References 

Government ministers of Tajikistan